Newton Airport may refer to:

Newton Airport (New Jersey), in Newton, New Jersey, United States (FAA: 3N5)
Newton City/County Airport in Newton, Kansas, United States (FAA: EWK)
Newton Field, in Jackman, Maine, United States (FAA: 59B)
Newton Municipal Airport (Iowa), in Newton, Iowa, United States (FAA: TNU)
Newton Municipal Airport (Texas), in Newton, Texas, United States (FAA: 61R)

See also 

 Newton Municipal Airport (disambiguation)